The bristlebills are a genus Bleda of passerine birds in the bulbul family Pycnonotidae. They are found in the forest understorey of western and central Africa. They forage for insects at or near ground-level, often near water. They will follow driver ant swarms to catch prey items fleeing from the ants and they frequently join mixed-species feeding flocks.

They are 18–23 cm long with fairly long, stout bills. The upperparts are mainly green-brown while the underparts are yellow. The birds have whistling songs.

The nest is made of leaves or sticks and built in a shrub or small tree. Two eggs are laid.

Taxonomy
The genus Bleda was introduced in 1857 by the French naturalist Charles Lucien Bonaparte with the red-tailed bristlebill as the type species. The genus was named after Bleda, elder brother of Attila and joint ruler of the Huns.

Species
The genus contains five species:
 Red-tailed bristlebill (Bleda syndactylus)
 Green-tailed bristlebill (Bleda eximius)
 Grey-headed bristlebill (Bleda canicapillus)
 Yellow-lored bristlebill (Bleda notatus)
 Yellow-eyed bristlebill (Bleda ugandae)

Former species
Formerly, some authorities also considered the following species (or subspecies) as species within the genus Bleda:
 Kakamega greenbul (as Xenocichla kakamegae)
 Olive-breasted greenbul (as Xenocichla kikuyuensis)
 Mountain greenbul (as Xenocichla nigriceps)
 Black-browed greenbul (as Xenocichla fusciceps)
 Yellow-throated greenbul (as Xenocichla chlorigula)
 Stripe-cheeked greenbul (as Xenocichla milanjensis)
 Stripe-faced greenbul (as Xenocichla striifacies)
 Sjöstedt's greenbul (as Xenocichla clamans)
 Yellow-throated leaflove (as Xenocichla flavicollis)
 Uganda yellow-throated greenbul (as Xenocichla pallidigula)
 Gabon leaflove (as Xenocichla orientalis)
 Placid greenbul (as Xenocichla placida)
 Xavier's greenbul (as Xenocichla Xavieri)
 White-throated greenbul (as Xenocichla albigularis)
 Yellow-streaked greenbul (tenuirostris) (as Xenocichla tenuirostris)
 Sharpe's greenbul (as Bleda alfredi)
 Grey-headed greenbul (as Xenocichla poliocephala)
 Lowland tiny greenbul (as Xenocichla debilis)
 Yellow-bearded greenbul (as Xenocichla olivacea)

References
African Bird club (2006) ABC African Checklist: Passerines Accessed 31/07/07.
Serle, W.; Morel G.J. & Hartwig, W. (1977) Collins Field Guide: Birds of West Africa, HarperCollins.
Sinclair, Ian & Ryan, Peter (2003) Birds of Africa south of the Sahara, Struik, Cape Town.

Notes

External links

 
Taxa named by Charles Lucien Bonaparte